The Raiden Project, originally released in Japan as simply  is a port of the arcade games Raiden and Raiden II to the PlayStation. It was released in 1995 for North America as an original launch title on September 9, in Japan on January 27 and in Europe in November. This was the only console release of Raiden II and unlike previous ports, these versions are based directly on the arcade originals. The Project version of the first Raiden was available as a download from the Japanese PlayStation Network store, which could be played on either a PlayStation 3 or a PlayStation Portable.

Plot
The story of Raiden takes place in the year 2090, when a race of collective alien lifeforms known as the Crystals made Earth a target of invasion. In response, the world gathered together under one organization, the Vanquish Crystal Defense, and developed a cutting-edge weapon built from Crystal Technology: the Fighting Thunder aircraft. Fighting Thunder is launched as the last hope for humanity's survival.

In Raiden II, three years have passed since the Crystals were defeated. The remnants of the Crystal invasion force regrouped to launch another invasion on Earth. The Vanquish Crystal Defense had developed a new model of the Fighting Thunder with a new weapon for this new battle in humanity's war against the Crystals.

Gameplay
Both games consist of eight vertical scrolling stages of increasing difficulty. The player controls the Raiden fighters, engaging enemies and dodging their attacks. Collectible items include bombs and missile powerups as well as score-increasing medals. Both games in this compilation can be played by either one player or two players. In two player mode, both players play simultaneously and have a special attack that produces special projectiles that damage enemies by shooting the other player craft.

Additions in the port
The opening animation is a 3D rendering of the player's ship taking on the first stage boss from Raiden II.

Raiden Project includes a Horizontal Mode. Users can turn their monitors vertically and play the game in its proper arcade aspect ratio.

The conversion includes difficulty settings, credit limits, selection between original and rearranged soundtrack, on screen text positioning and the ability to save high scores with a memory card.

Reception

On release, Famicom Tsūshin scored the game a 27 out of 40. The four reviewers of Electronic Gaming Monthly scored it an 8.375 out of 10, describing it as an outstanding arcade translation. They especially praised the inclusion of Raiden II, as they generally felt that the original Raiden had become dated and that Raiden II was more challenging and fun. GamePro, in contrast, commented that both games are very dated, with repetitive gameplay and overdone concepts. They also complained of slowdown in the two-player mode and concluded that The Raiden Project is "closer to where games have been than where they're going".

Next Generation reviewed the game, rating it two stars out of five, and stated that "Raiden Project is a solid indicator of the PlayStation's ability to manipulate sprites and as such will find a welcome home with early adopters. But with endless credits at your disposal, and some poorly structured action, it's an ultimately shallow experience".

References

External links
 http://psx.ign.com/objects/000/000720.html (The Raiden Project page on IGN)

 http://www.game-rave.com/psx/playstation_perfect_guide/releasedgames/raiden_project/index.html

1995 video games
PlayStation (console) games
PlayStation (console)-only games
Ocean Software games
Vertically scrolling shooters
Video games developed in Japan
Seibu Kaihatsu games
Video game compilations